Dyspessa kostjuki is a species of moth of the family Cossidae. It is found in Russia and Ukraine.

The length of the forewings is 9–12 mm in males and about 11 mm in females. The forewings are light yellow. The hindwings are grey.

References

Moths described in 2005
Dyspessa
Moths of Europe